Johanna Ewana Ekmark (born 8 October 1994), also known as Winona Oak, is a Swedish singer-songwriter. She is best known for her collaborations with What So Not and The Chainsmokers for the songs "Beautiful" and "Hope".

Early life
Oak was born on Sollerön, an island in Lake Siljan in the central-southerly locality of Mora. She graduated from Moragymnasiet in 2013 and later moved to Stockholm.

Career
In February 2018, Oak collaborated with What So Not for the single "Beautiful", which won Best Independent Dance/Electronica/Club single at the AIR Independent Music Awards in July 2019.

In October 2018, Oak signed to Neon Gold and Atlantic.

Oak was featured on The Chainsmokers second studio album, Sick Boy (released December 2018), in the song "Hope". For the music video of the song, Oak appeared in "dressed in a tan trench coat and red flannel shirt".

On December 10, 2018, Oak released a music video for her cover of the song "Don't Save Me” by Haim, via Neon Gold and Atlantic.

Oak released her debut studio album Island of the Sun on June 10, 2022.

Discography

Studio albums

EPs

Singles

As lead artist

As featured artist

Awards and nominations

AIR Awards
The Australian Independent Record Awards (commonly known informally as AIR Awards) is an annual awards night to recognise, promote and celebrate the success of Australia's Independent Music sector.

|-
| AIR Awards of 2019
|"Beautiful" (featuring What So Not)
| Best Independent Dance, Electronica Or Club Single
| 
|-

References

Further reading
Somewhere Magazine interview
Profile on AllMusic

Swedish singer-songwriters
Living people
Musicians from Stockholm
People from Mora Municipality
1994 births
English-language singers from Sweden